Frank Walter Hiller (July 13, 1920 – January 8, 1987) was an American professional baseball pitcher who played in the Major Leagues from 1946 to 1953 for the New York Giants, Chicago Cubs, New York Yankees and Cincinnati Reds.

References

External links

Major League Baseball pitchers
New York Giants (NL) players
New York Yankees players
Chicago Cubs players
Cincinnati Reds players
Lafayette Leopards baseball players
Baseball players from New Jersey
People from Irvington, New Jersey
Sportspeople from Essex County, New Jersey
1920 births
1987 deaths